Elizabeth O'Neill may refer to:

 Elizabeth O'Neill (official) (died 2007), official at the Public Affairs department of the Australian Embassy in Jakarta, killed in a plane crash
 Elizabeth O'Neill (actress) (1791–1872), Irish actress
 Liz O'Neill (camogie)